Mas-ha is a Palestinian village located in the Salfit Governorate in the northern West Bank, 24 kilometers southwest of Nablus. According to the Palestinian Central Bureau of Statistics, it had a population of 2,003 in 2007.

Location
It is bordered by Biddya  to the east, Az Zawiya to the south, Azzun Atma  to the west, and Sanniriya and Beit Amin to the north.

History
Potsherds from the Byzantine,    Byzantine/Umayyad, Crusader/Ayyubid and Mamluk era have been found here.

Ottoman era
Potsherds from the early Ottoman era have also been found. Masha appeared in 1596 Ottoman tax registers as being in the Nahiya of Jabal Qubal, part of the Sanjak of Nablus. It had a population of five households, all Muslim. They paid a fixed tax rate of 33.3% on agricultural products, including wheat, barley, summer crops, olive trees, goats and beehives, a press for olives or grapes, and occasional revenues and a fixed tax for people of Nablus area; a total of 2,300 akçe.  

In 1838, Edward Robinson noted it as a village, Mes-ha, in the Jurat Merda district, south of Nablus.

French explorer Victor Guérin passed by the village in 1870, and estimated it as having about 300-350 inhabitants, and fig-tree lined borders. In 1882 the PEF's Survey of Western Palestine (SWP) described Mes-ha as "a good-sized village, with a high central house, but partly ruinous. It is supplied by cisterns, and the houses are of stone."

British Mandate era
In the 1922 census of Palestine conducted by the British Mandate authorities, Mas-ha (called: Masha)  had a population of 80, all Muslims, increasing slightly in the 1931 census to 87 Muslims in a total of 20 houses. 

In the 1945 statistics the population was 110, all Muslims, while the total land area was 8,263 dunams, according to an official land and population survey. Of this, 1,612 were allocated for plantations and irrigable land, 2,482 for cereals, while 18 dunams were classified as built-up (urban) areas.

Jordanian era
In the wake of the 1948 Arab–Israeli War, and after the 1949 Armistice Agreements, Mas-ha came under Jordanian rule.

In 1961, the population was 478.

Post-1967

Since the Six-Day War in 1967, Mas-ha has been under Israeli occupation.

In the early 2000s, there were several protest against the plans of the building of the Israeli West Bank barrier, which would cut off Mas-ha villagers from much of their land. The protest, which resulted in the shooting of one Israeli citizen in 2003, were ultimately unsuccessful.

Loss of land
Mas-ha has been subjected to numerous Israeli confiscations for the benefit of various Israeli objectives.  ARIJ lists the losses as follows:

See also
The Color of Olives, documentary film about the Amer family, in Mas-ha

References

Bibliography

External links
Welcome To Mas-ha
Mas'ha, IWPS
Mas’ha, Welcome to Palestine
Survey of Western Palestine, Map 14:    IAA, Wikimedia commons 
Mas-ha Village (Fact Sheet), Applied Research Institute–Jerusalem (ARIJ)
Mas-ha Village Profile, ARIJ
Mas-ha, aerial photo, ARIJ
Development Priorities and Needs in Mas-ha, ARIJ
The people of Mas'ha protest against the wall 27/07/03,  Gush Shalom
Mas-ha: A village robbed by the Segregation Wall 24 March, 2004, POICA
Difficult olive harvest season in Mas-ha Village  27 November, 2006,  POICA
Israeli Occupation Forces prevent Mas-ha villagers from reaching their lands behind the Isolation Wall, 24 January, 2010, POICA
 Confiscation until further Notice Az Zawiya and Mas-ha- Salfit Governorate 10 January, 2012, POICA
Mas-ha map

Towns in Salfit Governorate
Salfit Governorate
Municipalities of the State of Palestine